Bloody Friday is a 1972 crime film directed by Rolf Olsen and starring Raimund Harmstorf, Amadeus August, and Gianni Macchia.

It was shot on location in Munich and other parts of Bavaria.

Plot
After escaping from a courtroom during his trial, a major criminal plans the biggest bank robbery every to have taken place in the country.

Main cast
Raimund Harmstorf as Heinz Klett
Amadeus August as Christian Hofbauer
Gianni Macchia as Luigi Belloni
Christine Böhm as Heidi Hofbauer
Ernst H. Hilbich as Ernst Pylobar
Gila von Weitershausen as Marion Lotzmann
Daniela Giordano as Dagmar Neuss
Walter Buschhoff as Walter Lotzmann
Renate Roland as Helga Radtke
Horst Naumann as Dr. Mayer-Lippe
Totò Mignone as Franz Muhl
E. O. Fuhrmann as Prosecutor
Ursula Erber as Irmgard Zukunft
Werner Heyking as Dr. Eminger

Production
Fernando Di Leo revised the screenplay of the film and is uncredited in the film's credits.

Release
Bloody Friday was released in West Germany where it was distributed by Gloria Film on 8 May 1972. It was distributed in Italy by Alpherat on 6 February 1973 under the title Violenza contro violenza. The film grossed 135,195,000 Italian lire on its theatrical release in Italy.

References

External links

1972 films
1972 crime films
German crime films
West German films
Italian crime films
1970s German-language films
Films directed by Rolf Olsen
Films about bank robbery
Films about hostage takings
Gloria Film films
1970s German films
1970s Italian films